Afro-Haitians or Black Haitians are Haitians who trace their full or partial ancestry to sub-Saharan Africa. They form the largest racial group in Haiti and together with other Afro-Caribbean groups, the largest racial group in the region.

The majority of Afro-Haitians are descendants of enslaved Africans brought to the island by the Spanish Empire and the Kingdom of France to work on plantations. Since the Haitian Revolution, Afro-Haitians have been the largest racial group in the country, accounting for 85% of the population in the early 21st century. The remaining 15% of the population is made up of mixed persons (mixed African and European descent) and other minor groups (European, Arab, and Asian descent and native taino ancestry).

Origins 
The African people of Haiti derived from various areas, spanning from Senegal to the Congo. Most of which were brought from West Africa, with a considerable number also brought from Central Africa. Some of these groups include those from the former Kongo kingdom (Kongo),Benin (Ewe Many other peoople trace so much of their DNA from the native people. and Yoruba) and Togo land. Others in Haiti were brought from Senegal, Guinea (imported by the Spanish since the sixteenth century and then by the French), Sierra Leone, Windward Coast, Angola, Cameroon, Nigeria, Ghana, Togo, and Southeast Africa (such as the Bara tribesmen of Madagascar, who were brought to Haiti in the eighteenth century). Haitian culture is very tied to West African culture, especially that of pre-colonialism Benin, Haitian Vodou mostly has origins from the original West African Vodun of Benin and the French-based Haitian Creole language has influences from several African languages including the Fon language. At the time of the Haitian Revolution war, an event that involved the expulsion of many whites (mostly French) in Haiti, many of the blacks in Haiti were African-born and had no non-African admixture. This was because the average African slave in colonial Haiti had a short life span and France continuously imported thousands of Africans yearly to keep the slave population up, by 1790 there were nearly 600,000 slaves, outnumbering whites about 20 to 1.

Demography 

Although Haiti averages approximately 250 people per square kilometre (650 per sq mi.), its population is concentrated most heavily in urban areas, coastal plains, and valleys. Haiti's population was about 9.8 million according to UN 2008 estimates, with half of the population being under 20 years old. The first formal census, taken in 1950, showed a population of 3.1 million.

According to The World Factbook, 95% of Haitians are primarily of African descent; the remaining 5% of the population are mostly of mixed-race and European background, and a number of other ethnicities.

Culture 
Culture, religion and social organization are the result in Haiti of a process of syncretism between French and African traditions, mainly Dahomey-Nigerian. A small minority cultural practice in Haiti is Haitian Vodou. This probably originated in Benin, although there are strong elements added from the Congo of Central Africa and many African nations are represented in the liturgy of Sèvis Lwa. A generally ignored but significant element is that of the Taino people, the indigenous people of Hispaniola. The Tainos were influential in the belief system of Haitian Vodou, especially in the Petro cult, a religious group with no counterpart on the African continent. Characterized by the worship of the loa, the sect has influences from Native American folklore zemis. The entire northern area of Haiti is influenced by the practices of the Congo. In the north, these are often called Rites Congo or Lemba. In the south, the Congo influence is called Petwo (Petro). Many loa are of Congolese origin, such as Basimbi and Lemba.

Polygyny persists alongside Catholic marriages. The dances and some forms of recreation tie in with African activities. The preparation of beans is done in the style of Western Africa. Popular literature retains fables and other forms that are expressed in the vernacular. Economic activities are typical of Western culture and clothing tends to be European, but the scarf worn by women over the head is typical of clothing worn throughout West Africa.

Two languages are spoken in Haiti. French is taught in schools and known by about 42% of the population, but spoken by a minority of black and biracial residents, in Port-au-Prince and other cities. Haitian Creole, with roots in French, Spanish, Taino. Portuguese, English and African languages, is a language with dialectal forms in different regions. It is spoken throughout the country, but is used extensively in rural areas.

The music of Haiti is heavily influenced by the rhythms which came from Africa with the slaves. Two of these rhythms come directly from the harbour and the Congo; a third rhythm, the "petro", developed on the island during the colonial era. All are part of the rhythms used in Vodou ceremonies. These rhythms have created a musical style, rasin, where percussion is the most important musical instrument, and despite being closely related to religion has become a popular kind of folk music. Another type of music, which arises spontaneously from people with hand-held instruments, is twoubadou, a musical style that has endured to this day. Currently the music heard in Haiti's Compas genre is a little softer than the merengue, and combines Congo rhythms with European and Caribbean influences. Konpa is the most current version of this rhythm.

Notable People
 Dutherson Clerveaux
 Hannes Delcroix
 Samuel Dalembert
 Mikaël Cantave
 Wyclef
 Fabrice Noël
 Jhondly van der Meer

See also 

 Marabou
 Haitian emigration
 Haitians
 Haitian Revolution
 Slavery in Haiti
 Afro-Dominicans
 Afro-Latin Americans
 Afro-Caribbean
 African diaspora
 History of West Africa
 Black people

References and footnotes

 
Ethnic groups in Haiti
 
People of African descent
People of Saint-Domingue